Portugal competed at the 1992 Summer Olympics in Barcelona, Spain. 90 competitors, 68 men and 22 women, took part in 71 events in 14 sports.

These Olympics saw Portugal listing the biggest share of competitors in the athletics, but also debuting in the tennis and badminton events, recently elevated to Olympic sports, as with the women's judo. Portugal also participated in the roller hockey tournament (demonstration sport), as current world champions, but finishing just outside the podium.

Competitors
The following is the list of number of competitors in the Games.

Archery

Women's Individual Competition:
 Ana Sousa
 Qualifying round — 1288 pts (→ 22nd)
{|class=wikitable style="text-align:center;"
!70m!!60m!!50m!!30m!!Total
|-
|297||334||321||336||1288
|}
 Elimination round — 98 pts (→ 26th)
 1/16 finals — Xiangjun Ma (CHN) (→ lost 101:98, did not advance)

Athletics

Men's events
800m:
 António Abrantes
 Round 1 (heat 7) — 1:50.89 (→ 5th, did not advance)

1,500m:
 Mário Silva
 Round 1 (heat 2) — 3:38.57 (→ 3rd)
 Semi-final (heat 2) — 3:38.09 (→ 9th, did not advance)

5,000m:
 Carlos Monteiro
 Semi-final (heat 4) — 14:00.53 (→ 10th, did not advance)
 Domingos Castro
 Semi-final (heat 3) — 13:24:57 (→ 5th, advanced as 2nd fastest loser)
 Final — 13:38.09 (→ 11th)
 Raimundo Santos
 Semi-final (heat 2) — 13:48.06 (→ 7th, did not advance)

10,000m:
 Domingos Castro
 Round 1 (heat 1) — did not finish
 Fernando Couto
 Round 1 (heat 2) — 29:20.06 (→ 15th, did not advance)

Marathon:
 António Pinto → did not finish
 Dionísio Castro → did not finish
 Joaquim Pinheiro → did not finish

20 km Walk:
 José Urbano — disqualified

50 km Walk:
 José Magalhães — 4:20:21 (→ 28th)
 José Pinto — disqualified
 José Urbano — 4:16:31 (→ 25th)

400m Hurdles:
 Pedro Rodrigues
 Round 1 (heat 3) — 49.46 (→ 5th, did not advance)

3000m Steeplechase:
 João Junqueira
 Round 1 (heat 3) — 8:35.68 (→ 8th, advanced as 3rd fastest loser)
 Semi-final (heat 1) — 8:39.17 (→ 10th, did not advance)

4 × 100 m Relay:
 Luís Barroso, Luís Cunha, Pedro Agostinho and Pedro Curvelo
 Round 1 (heat 2) — 40.30 (→ 5th, did not advance)

4 × 400 m Relay:
 Álvaro Silva, José Mendes, Paulo Curvelo and Pedro Rodrigues
 Round 1 (heat 1) — 3:10.11 (→ 7th, did not advance)

Pole Vault:
 Nuno Fernandes
Qualifying round (heat 2) — 5,00 (→ 15th, did not advance)
{| class="wikitable" style="text-align:center;"
!4,80!!5,00!!5,20!!5,30!!5,40!!5,50!!5,55!!5,60!!Result
|-
|XXO||XO||XXX||||||||||||5,00
|}

Women's events
100m:
 Lucrécia Jardim
 Round 1 (heat 6) — 11.58 (→ 4th)
 Round 2 (heat 1) — 11.66 (→ 7th, did not advance)

200m:
 Lucrécia Jardim
 Round 1 (heat 1) — 23.26 (→ 3rd)
 Round 2 (heat 2) — 23.09 (→ 5th, did not advance)

800m:
 Carla Sacramento
 Round 1 (heat 2) — 2:00.57 (→ 3rd, advanced as 5th fastest loser)
 Semi-final (heat 2) — 2:02.85 (→ 6th, did not advance)

1500m:
 Carla Sacramento
 Round 1 (heat 1) — 4:10.01 (→ 5th)
 Semi-final (heat 2) — 4:05.54 (→ 9th, did not advance)

3000m:
 Fernanda Ribeiro
 Round 1 (heat 2) — 9:07.69 (9th, did not advance)

10000m:
 Albertina Dias
 Round 1 (heat 2) — 32:15.05 (→ 6th)
 Final — 32:0.393 (→ 13th)
 Conceição Ferreira
 Round 1 (heat 1) — 32:31.95 (→ 9th, advanced as 1st fastest loser)
 Final — did not finish
 Fernanda Marques
 Round 1 (heat 2) — 32:38.16 (→ 8th)
 Final — did not finish

Marathon:
 Aurora Cunha → did not finish
 Manuela Machado → 2:38:22 (→ 7th)

10 km Walk:
 Isilda Gonçalves — 50:23 (→ 34th)
 Susana Feitor — disqualified

400m Hurdles:
 Marta Moreira
 Round 1 (heat 2) — 58.24 (→ 6th, did not advance)

4 × 400 m Relay:
 Eduarda Coelho, Elsa Amaral, Lucrécia Jardim and Marta Moreira
 Round 1 (heat 2) — 3:29.38 (→ 4th, advanced as 2nd fastest loser)
 Final — 3:36.85 (→ 8th)

Discus Throw:
 Teresa Machado
 Qualifying round — 4,98 (→ 14th, did not advance)

Badminton

Men's Individual Competition:
 Ricardo Fernandes
 1/32 finals — R. Liljequist (FIN) (→ lost by 15-3, 15-11 – did not advance)
 Fernando Silva
 1/32 finals — Peter Axelsson (SWE) (→ lost by 15-7, 15-8 – did not advance)

Men's Team Competition:
 Fernando Silva and Ricardo Fernandes
 1/32 finals — Benny Lee and Thomas Reidy (USA) (→ lost by 15-1, 15-10 – did not advance)

Canoeing

Sprint
Men

Equestrianism

Individual Eventing:
 António Braz — –238.60 pts (→ 58th)
{| class="wikitable" style="text-align:center;"
!Event!!Dressage!!Endurance!!Jumping
|-
!Pts (Rank)
|–85.00 (75th)||–143.60 (57th)||–10.00 (24th)
|-
!GeneralPts (Rank)
|–85.00 (75th)||–228.60 (59th)||–238.60 (58th)
|}

 António Ramos — –186.70 pts (46th)
{| class="wikitable" style="text-align:center;"
!Event!!Dressage!!Endurance!!Jumping
|-
!Pts (Rank)
|–72.40 (61st)||–102.80 (47th)||–11.50 (41st)
|-
!GeneralPts (Rank)
|–72.40 (61st)||–175.20 (48th)||–186.70 (46th)
|}

 Bernardo Rodrigues — eliminated
{| class="wikitable" style="text-align:center;"
!Event!!Dressage!!Endurance!!Jumping
|-
!Pts (Rank)
|–69.80 (54th)||eliminated||—
|-
!GeneralPts (Rank)
|–69.80 (54th)||eliminated||—
|}

 Vasco Ramires
{| class="wikitable" style="text-align:center;"
!Event!!Dressage!!Endurance!!Jumping
|-
!Pts (Rank)
|–91.40 (79th)||–82.40 (39th)||0.00 (1st)
|-
!GeneralPts (Rank)
|–91.40 (79th)||–173.80 (47th)||–173.80 (41st)
|}

Team Eventing:
 António Braz, António Ramos and Bernardo Rodrigues — –599.10 pts (→ 15th)
{| class="wikitable" style="text-align:center;"
!Event!!Dressage!!Endurance!!Jumping
|-
!Pts (Rank)
|–248.80 (?)||–328.80 (?)||–21.50 (?)
|-
!GeneralPts (Rank)
|–248.80 (?)||–577.60 (?)||–599.10 (15th)
|}

Individual Jumping:
 Jorge Matias — 83rd

Team Jumping:
 Jorge Matias — did not start

Fencing

Four male fencers represented Portugal in 1992.

Men's épée
 José Bandeira
 Qualifying round (pool 4) — 6 matches, 1 victory (→ 6th, 61st overall, did not advance)
 Rui Frazão
 Qualifying round (pool 10) — 6 matches, 1 victory (→ 7th, 60th overall, did not advance)

Men's foil
 José Guimarães
 Qualifying round (pool 2) — 6 matches, 1 victory (→ 7th, 52nd overall, did not advance)

Men's sabre
 Luís Silva
 Qualifying round (pool 4) — 5 matches, 0 victories (→ 6th, 40th overall, did not advance)

Gymnastics
Rhythmics:
 Clara Piçarra — did not start (→ 43rd)

Judo

Men's events
Extra Lightweight (–60 kg):
 Rui Ludovino
Preliminary rounds A
 1/32 finals — Pina Garcia (DOM) (→ won by yuko)
 1/16 finals — Dashgombyn Battulga (MGL) (→ lost by ippon, did not advance)

Half Lightweight (–65 pts):
 Augusto Almeida
Preliminary rounds B
 1/32 finals — V. Cespedes (PAR) (→ won by ippon)
 1/16 finals — R. Sampaio (BRA) (→ lost by ippon, did not advance)
Repêchage B
 1/32 finals — Bye
 1/16 finals — Sang-Moon Kim (KOR) (→ lost by ippon, did not advance)

Lightweight (–71 kg):
 Rui Domingues
Preliminary rounds A
 1/32 finals — Bye
 1/16 finals — C. Shi (CHN) (→ lost by waza-ari, did not advance)

Half Middleweight (–78 kg):
Preliminary rounds B
 António Matias
 1/32 finals — Bye
 1/16 finals — Anton Summer (AUT) (→ lost by double waza-ari (=ippon), did not advance)

Middleweight (–86 kg):
 Pedro Cristóvão
Preliminary rounds B
 1/32 finals — Bye
 1/16 finals — D. Kistler (SUI) (→ lost by koka, did not advance)

Women's events
Half Lightweight (–52 kg):
 Paula Saldanha — 7th
Preliminary rounds B
 1/32 finals — Bye
 1/16 finals — R. Dechinmaa (MGL) (→ won by ippon)
 1/8 finals — Lyne Poirier (CAN) (→ won by koka)
 1/4 finals — Jessica Gal (NED) (→ lost by ippon)
Repêchage B
 1/32 finals — Bye
 1/16 finals — Bye
 1/8 finals — Maktsoutova (EUN) (→ won by yuko)
 1/4 finals — A. Giungi (ITA) (→ lost by yusei-gachi, did not advance)

Men's Lightweight (–56 kg):
 Filipa Cavalleri
Preliminary rounds B
 1/32 finals — Bye
 1/16 finals — Z. Blagojevic (IOP) (→ won by yar?)
 1/8 finals — P. Pinitwong (THA) (→ won by yusei-gachi)
 1/4 finals — Flagothier (BEL) (→ lost by yuko)
Repêchage B
 1/32 finals — Bye
 1/16 finals — Bye
 1/8 finals — Kate Donahoo (USA) (→ lost by waza-ari, did not advance)

Half Heavyweight (–72 kg):
 Sandra Godinho
Preliminary rounds A
 1/32 finals — Bye
 1/16 finals — Werbrouck (BEL) (→ lost by yuko, did not advance)

Modern pentathlon

One male pentathlete represented Portugal in 1992.

Men's Individual Competition:
 Manuel Barroso — 4719 pts (→ 53rd)
{|class=wikitable style="text-align:center;"
!rowspan=3|Event
!colspan=2|Fencing
!colspan=2|Swimming
!colspan=3|Shooting
!colspan=2|Cross-country
!colspan=2|Riding
|-
!Vict.!!Pen.
!Time!!Heat
!Hits!!Pen.!!Heat
!Time!!Pen.
!Time!!Pen.
|-
|19||–
|3:23.2||2
|159||60||1
|12:26.0||–
|1:58.7||–
|-
!Pts (Rank)
|colspan=2|541 (62nd)
|colspan=2|1248 (25th)
|colspan=3|595 (65th)
|colspan=2|1327 (1st)
|colspan=2|1008 (26th)
|-
!GeneralPts (Rank)
|colspan=2|541 (62nd)
|colspan=2|1799 (59th)
|colspan=3|2384 (33rd)
|colspan=2|3711 (?)
|colspan=2|4719 (53rd)
|}

Roller Hockey
Men's Competition:
 António Heitor, António Neves, Franklin Pais, Luís Ferreira, Paulo Almeida, Paulo Alves, Pedro Alves, Rui Lopes, Vitor Hugo Silva and Vitor Fortunato — 4th
 Preliminary round (Group A) — 5 matches, 4 victories, 1 defeat – 8 pts (→ 2nd)
 Semi-finals — 5 matches, 3 victories, 2 defeats – 6 pts (→ 3rd)
 Final 3rd/4th — Italy (→ lost 3-2)

Rowing

Men's Double Sculls:
 Daniel Alves and João Santos
 Round 1 (heat 3) — 6:54.55 (→ 5th)
 Repêchage 4 — 6:46.14 (→ 4th)
 Semi-final C — 6:32.01 (→ 4th)
 Final D — 6:42.00 (→ 1st, 18th overall)

Sailing

Men's Lechner A-390:
 João Rodrigues — 233 pts (→ 23rd)
{|class=wikitable style="text-align:center;"
!Race!!1!!2!!3!!4!!5!!6!!7!!8!!9!!10!!rowspan=2|Total!!rowspan=2|Net
|-
!Place
|25th||10th||18th||20th||22nd||21st||24th||23rd||28th||18th 
|-
!Pts
|31||16||24||24||28||27||30||29||33||24||266||233
|}

Men's 470:
 Eduardo Seruca and Victor Hugo Rocha (helm) — 148 pts (→ 24th)
{|class=wikitable style="text-align:center;"
!Race!!1!!2!!3!!4!!5!!6!!7!!rowspan=2|Total!!rowspan=2|Net
|-
!Place
|23rd||27th||20th||26th||5th||21st||18th
|-
!Pts
|29||33||26||32||10||27||24||181||148
|}

Soling:
 António Tanger Correia (helm), Luís Miguel Santos and Ricardo Batista — 116 pts (→ 21st)
{|class=wikitable style="text-align:center;"
!Race!!1!!2!!3!!4!!5!!6!!rowspan=2|Total!!rowspan=2|Net
|-
!Place
|21st||21st||16th||18th||16th||15th
|-
!Pts
|27||27||22||24||22||21||143||148
|}

Star:
 Fernando Bello (helm) and Francisco Pinheiro de Melo — 101 pts (→ 12th)
{|class=wikitable style="text-align:center;"
!Race!!1!!2!!3!!4!!5!!6!!7!!rowspan=2|Total!!rowspan=2|Net
|-
!Place
|1st||9th||False start||19th||8th||21st||14th
|-
!Pts
|0||15||33||25||14||27||20||134||101
|}

Shooting

Men's Trap:
 António Palminha
 Preliminary round — 145 hits (→ 14th)
{|class="wikitable" style="text-align:center;"
!Round!!1!!2!!3!!4!!5!!6!!Total
|-
!Hits
|24||25||25||25||24||22||145
|}
 Semi-final — 193 hits (→ 11th, did not advance)
{|class="wikitable" style="text-align:center;"
!Round!!1!!2!!3!!4!!5!!6!!7!!8!!Total
|-
!Hits
|24||25||25||25||23||25||24||22||193
|}

 João Rebelo
 Preliminary round — 145 hits (→ 10th)
{|class="wikitable" style="text-align:center;"
!Round!!1!!2!!3!!4!!5!!6!!Total
|-
!Hits
|21||25||25||24||25||25||145
|}
 Semi-final — 191 hits (→ 16th, did not advance)
{|class="wikitable" style="text-align:center;"
!Round!!1!!2!!3!!4!!5!!6!!7!!8!!Total
|-
!Hits
|21||25||25||22||24||24||25||25||191
|}

 Manuel Silva
 Preliminary round — 146 hits (→ 7th)
{|class="wikitable" style="text-align:center;"
!Round!!1!!2!!3!!4!!5!!6!!Total
|-
!Hits
|24||24||25||23||25||25||146
|}
 Semi-final — 193 hits (→ 11th, did not advance)
{|class="wikitable" style="text-align:center;"
!Round!!1!!2!!3!!4!!5!!6!!7!!8!!Total
|-
!Hits
|24||24||25||25||22||23||25||25||193
|}

Women's 10m Air Rifle:
 Carla Ribeiro
 Preliminary round — 387 hits (→ 26th, did not advance)
{|class="wikitable" style="text-align:center;"
!Round!!1!!2!!3!!4!!Total
|-
!Hits
|94||99||97||97||387
|}

Swimming

Men's events
100m Backstroke:
 Miguel Arrobas
 Heats (heat 2) — 59.37 (→ 3rd, did not advance – 42nd overall)

200m Backstroke:
 Miguel Arrobas
 Heats (heat 2) — 2:06.02 (→ 6th, did not advance – 34th overall)

100m Breaststroke:
 Alexandre Yokochi
 Heats (heat 3) — 1:05.61 (→ 3rd, did not advance – 39th overall)

200m Breaststroke:
 Alexandre Yokochi
.* Heats (heat 4) — 2:18.97 (→ 3rd, did not advance – 25th overall)

100m Butterfly:
 Miguel Cabrita
 Heats (heat 4) — 57.07 (→ 6th, did not advance – 46th overall)

200m Butterfly:
 Diogo Madeira
 Heats (heat 3) — 2:02.22 (→ 2nd, did not advance – 29th overall)
 Miguel Cabrita
 Heats (heat 4) — 2:04.28 (→ 6th, did not advance – 34th place)

50m Freestyle:
 Paulo Trindade
 Heats (heat 7) — 23.81 (→ 8th, did not advance – 36th overall)

400m Freestyle:
 Artur Costa
 Heats (heat 2) — 3:58.80 (→ 3rd, did not advance – 26th overall)

1500m Freestyle:
 Artur Costa
 Heats (heat 2) — 15:41.26 (→ 6th, did not advance — 17th overall)

200m Individual Medley
 Diogo Madeira
 Heats (heat 3) — 2:07.38 (→ 2nd, did not advance – 33rd place)

Women's events
100m Backstroke:
 Ana Barros
 Heats (heat 3) — 1:06.11 (→ 7th, did not advance – 36th overall)

200m Backstroke:
 Ana Barros
 Heats (heat 3) — 2:17.59 (→ 2nd, did not advance – 24th overall)

100m Butterfly:
 Ana Alegria
 Heats (heat 3) — 1:04.18 (→ 4th, did not advance – 36th overall)
 Joana Arantes
 Heats (heat 2) — 1:04.59 (→ 4th, did not advance – 39th place)

200m Butterfly:
 Joana Arantes
 Heat (heat 4) — 2:16.56 (→ 6th, did not advance – 19th overall)

100m Freestyle:
 Ana Alegria
 Heats (heat 2) — 1:00.35 (→ 6th, did not advance – 41st overall)

Tennis

Men's Singles Competition:
 Bernardo Mota
 1/32 finals — Goran Ivanišević (CRO) (→ lost by 2-6, 2-6, 7-6, 6-4, 3-6 – did not advance)

Men's Doubles Competition:
 Emanuel Couto and Bernardo Mota
 1/16 finals — Guy Forget and Henri Leconte (FRA) (→ lost by 1-6, 3-6, 1-6 – did not advance)

Wrestling

Men's Greco-Roman Welterweight (–74 kg):
 Paulo Martins
Elimination round B — 2 defeats, 1.0 technical pts (→ 8th, did not advance)
 Round 1 — Dobri Ivanov (BUL) (→ lost by 6-1; +1.0 technical pts)
 Round 2 — Qingkun Wei (CHN) (→ lost by 16-0; +0 technical pts)

Officials
 José Geraldes de Oliveira (chief of mission)
 António Livramento (roller hockey coach)
 Luís Alfredo Dias Rei (roller hockey)

References

Barcelona'92 Olympic Organizing Committee (1992). Official Report of the Games of the XXV Olympiad Barcelona 1992 - Volume 4: The Games (Retrieved on November 12, 2006).
Barcelona'92 Olympic Organizing Committee (1992). Official Report of the Games of the XXV Olympiad Barcelona 1992 - Volume 5: The results (Retrieved on November 12, 2006).
sports-reference

Nations at the 1992 Summer Olympics
1992 Summer Olympics
1992 in Portuguese sport